Varanasi South is a constituency of the Uttar Pradesh Legislative Assembly covering the city of Varanasi South in the Varanasi district of Uttar Pradesh, India.

Varanasi South is one of five assembly constituencies in the Varanasi Lok Sabha constituency. Since 2008, this assembly constituency is numbered 389 amongst 403 constituencies.

Members of Legislative Assembly

Election results

2022
Bharatiya Janta Party candidate Dr. Neelkanth Tiwari won in 2022 Uttar Pradesh Legislative Elections defeating Samajvadi Party candidate Kameshwar Nath Dixit alias Kishan by a margin of 10,722 votes.

2017
Bharatiya Janta Party candidate Dr. Neelkanth Tiwari won in 2017 Uttar Pradesh Legislative Elections defeating Indian National Congress candidate Rajesh Mishra by a margin of 17,226 votes.

References

External links
 

Assembly constituencies of Uttar Pradesh
Varanasi
Politics of Varanasi district